List of Red Star Belgrade's official international matches from 1956–57 season until today.

A brief history
Red Star's European story began in 1956–57 season with match in Kerkrade, Netherlands. The first rival in the first round of the 1956–57 European Cup were Dutch champions Rapid JC (the club later changed its name to Roda JC), with Bora Kostić scoring Red Star's first ever European goal. Since the first European Cup semi-final, when Red Star was eliminated by Fiorentina, Red Star participated 14 times in a European competition quarter-final (not counting the Mitropa Cup), and was a semi-finalist in each of the three UEFA competitions for a total of six appearances. Throughout this time, Red Star steadily kept its place among the top 15 European clubs on UEFA's ranking list, situated just behind Real Madrid and Barcelona for the number of season participations in European Cups. In 1991, Red Star finally won the 1991 European Cup, in a game against Marseille.

From 1992 to 1995, the clubs from FR Yugoslavia were forbidden to take part in the European competitions, due to the sanctions against Yugoslavia. For two decades after 1995, Red Star has only made two group stage appearances of the second-tier competition UEFA Cup, in 2005–06 and 2007–08.

In 2017–18 UEFA Europa League, Red Star made another group stage appearance and even advanced to the "Round of 32" where it lost to CSKA Moscow. After 26 years of absence from the top-tier European competition, Red Star made group stage appearance of the 2018–19 UEFA Champions League. For the second season in a row, Red Star qualified for the 2019–20 UEFA Champions League group stage.

Club all-time European record

UEFA Ranking 

The following data indicates Red Star coefficient rankings.

Best results in international competitions
 

Biggest win in UEFA competition:

List of matches 
Note: Red Star score always listed first.

1956–70

1970–80

1980–90

1990–2000

2000–10

2010–20

2020–present

Overall record by country

As of 3 November 2022

Top scorers in international competitions

Source

International individual awards

Ballon d'Or
 2nd:  Darko Pančev (1991)
 2nd:  Dejan Savićević (1991)
 3rd:  Dragan Džajić (1968)
European Golden Shoe
  Darko Pančev (1991)
European Cup top scorer
  Borislav Cvetković (1987)
European Coach of the Season
  Ljupko Petrović (1991)
Bravo Award
  Robert Prosinečki (1991)
UEFA Jubilee Golden Player
  Dragan Džajić (2003)
  Darko Pančev (2003)

UEFA Euro Golden Boot
  Dragan Džajić (1968)
UEFA Euro Team of the Tournament
  Vladimir Durković (1960)
  Dragoslav Šekularac (1960)
  Bora Kostić (1960)
  Dragan Džajić (1968)
FIFA World Cup All-Star Team
  Dragan Stojković (1990)
FIFA World Cup Best Young Player Award
  Robert Prosinečki (1990)
FIFA U-20 World Cup Golden Ball
  Robert Prosinečki (1987)
FIFA U-20 World Cup Golden Glove
  Predrag Rajković (2015)

References

External links 
 UEFA European Cup Football Result and Qualification by Bert Kassies

 
Red Star
Red Star
Red Star
Yugoslav football clubs in international competitions